GayJapanNews is a web-based news service in the Japanese language specializing in LGBT issues from around the world. The service was launched in 2005 to increase the visibility of gays and lesbians, whose presence is negligible in traditional media within Japan. The site is primarily in Japanese but with some English available. It was co-founded by Tom Paine and Hiroshi Mochizuki, who serves as editor. Staff members have been asked to comment on LGBT issues in Japan by news organizations such as the Asahi Shimbun, NHK, and The Japan Times. GayJapanNews has also held workshops and advocated for LGBT issues in Japan.

See also

 Homosexuality in Japan
 LGBT rights in Japan
 Mass media in Japan
 Sexual minorities in Japan
 Shinjuku ni-chōme, Tokyo
 List of LGBT events

References

External links
 GayJapanNews Bilingual

Internet properties established in 2005
LGBT-related mass media in Japan
LGBT-related websites